Ala-ud-Din Hasan Bahman Shah (died 10 February 1358) whose original name was Zafar Khan or Hasan Gangu, was the founder of the Bahmani Sultanate.

Ancestry and early life

Zafar Khan or Hasan Gangu was a noble in the employ of Muhammad bin Tughluq. According to Gadakari, Hasan Gangu was a Brahmin convert to Islam. According to Richard Eaton, Zafar Khan was the nephew of a former high official in the Delhi Sultanate court.  His ancestry is known, but detractors inspired by the prejudices of the partisan advocate of the Adil Shahi dynasty have claimed that his ancestry is unknown. Furthermore, there is a legend regarding him narrated by the 17th century poet Ferishta, which says that he was a servant of a Brahmin astrologer named Gangu of Delhi and he was himself called Hasan Gangu. Historians have not found any corroboration for the legend, but Barani also corroborates the fact that Alauddin's original name was Hasan Gangu. Ferishta mentions mentioned that later poets "who wanted to flatter him" called Hasan Gangu a descendant of Bahman, but considers it implausible. 
It is possible that Bahman is a corrupted persianized form of  Brahman, and Hassan Gangu might have been born as a Hindu.

In 1339, Zafar Khan participated in an uprising against the Tughluqs. This turned out unsuccessful; he and his allies were exiled to Afghanistan the same year. He managed to return to the Deccan, and in 1346 he participated in a siege of Gulbarga, at the time under Tughluq control. The siege proved successful.

He was made a governor. In 1347 he was made commander of an army in Daulatabad. On 3 August 1347 Nasir-ud-Din Ismail Shah (Ismail Mukh, whom the rebel amirs of the Deccan placed on the throne of Daulatabad in 1345) abdicated in his favour and he set up the Bahmani Kingdom with its headquarters at Hasanabad (Gulbarga).
He was in charge of a three city Jahangir, with his main rule at Miraj.

Reign
On establishing an independent kingdom Zafar Khan took the title of Abu'l-Muzaffar Ala-ud-din Bahman Shah. He gave Ismail Mukh a jagir near Jamkhandi and later conferred to him the highest title of his kingdom, Amir-ul-Umara. But Narayana, a local Hindu chieftain still succeeded in turning Ismail against Bahman Shah for a short period before he poisoned Ismail.

Bahman Shah led his first campaign against Warangal in 1350 and forced its ruler Kapaya Nayaka to cede to him the fortress of Kaulas. His kingdom was divided into four provinces and he appointed a governor for each province. During his reign Hasan fought many wars with Vijayanagara.  By the time of his death the kingdom stretched from north to south from the Wainganga River to Krishna and east to west from Bhongir to Daulatabad.

He was succeeded by his son Mohammed Shah I after his death in 1358.

References

Sources 
 
 
 
 
 
 
 

1358 deaths
Bahmani Sultans
Year of birth unknown